Massilia suwonensis is a Gram-negative, rod-shaped, motile bacterium from the genus Massilia and  family Oxalobacteraceae, which were isolated from air samples in the Jeju Island and Suwon region in Korea.

References

External links
Type strain of Massilia suwonensis at BacDive -  the Bacterial Diversity Metadatabase

Burkholderiales
Bacteria described in 2011